René Sarvil (18 January 1901 – 31 March 1975) was a French actor.

Sarvil was born in Toulon, France, and died in 1975 in Marseille.

Partial filmography
 Notre-Dame de la Mouise (1941)
 Cyrano de Bergerac (1946)
 Oriental Port (1950)
 Sergil Amongst the Girls (1952)
 Manon of the Spring (1952)
 The Impure Ones (1954)
 Letters from My Windmill (1954)
 House on the Waterfront (1955)
 Three Sailors (1957)
 La belle Américaine (1961)

External links

1901 births
1975 deaths
French male film actors
Actors from Toulon
20th-century French male actors